WSAQ (107.1 FM) is a country music radio station licensed to Port Huron, Michigan, with an effective radiated power of 6,000 watts. WSAQ covers St. Clair County, Michigan and Lambton County, Ontario as well as portions of Macomb, Lapeer, and Sanilac counties. The station is owned by Radio First and broadcasts from studios on  Huron Avenue in Downtown Port Huron.

History
In 1964, the station signed on for the first time as WHLS-FM. Featuring a simulcast of the AM station and then later a beautiful music format, it was soon renamed WSAQ, and adopted a country music format in spring 1982.

In 1999, original owner John Wismer died, and both WHLS and WSAQ were sold to Liggett Communications as part of Wismer's estate. Liggett also acquired then competitor Hanson Communications, owner of 1590 WHLX, 1380 WPHM, and 96.9 WBTI. Wismer's original studios at 808 Huron Avenue in Downtown Port Huron were expanded to accommodate all five stations. All of the Port Huron Liggett stations now operate under the brand name of Radio First.

In late 2009, WSAQ started broadcasting Radio Data System information (RDS)

On December 26, 2019 Sarnia radio station CHOK flipped back to country, giving WSAQ a local competitor. CHOK has a focus on Sarnia Lambton, while WSAQ has a focus on Port Huron.

Spring Anniversary Show
Every spring in April Q Country hosts the annual Spring Anniversary Show, where the tickets are given away and won by listeners. The event is hosted by Q Country at the McMorran Place Arena. The event has seen people like Blake Shelton, Craig Campbell, and Lee Brice.

See also
Blue Water Weather Telephone Service

Notes

External links

SAQ-FM
Country radio stations in the United States
Port Huron, Michigan
St. Clair County, Michigan
Radio stations established in 1964
SAQ-FM